Armando Trindade (born 25 October 1927 in Karachi, British India (now Pakistan)) studied at St Patrick's High School, Karachi. He received his religious training at the Papal Seminary, Kandy, Sri Lanka and was ordained a priest on 6 May 1950.

He undertook graduate studies at Oxford University in England, and then attended Stanford University in the United States for his doctoral degree.

Until 1962 he was principal of the St Lawrence's Boys High School in Karachi. He went on to become principal of St Paul's English High School where he remained until 1973. He also edited Christian Voice, Karachi the archdiocesan weekly.

On 5 July 1973  Pope Paul VI appointed him Auxiliary Bishop of the Roman Catholic Archdiocese of Lahore, Pakistan. On 10 July 1975  he was appointed Bishop of Lahore and on 23 April 1994 was appointed Archbishop of Lahore.
He has also been president of the Catholic Bishops' Conference of Pakistan. 
Archbishop Armando died on 31 July 2000.

Over 100 priests and nuns with lighted candles escorted the archbishop's body to the Sacred Heart Cathedral, Lahore in a procession before the funeral Mass on 5 August 2001.

Pakistan President Rafiq Tarar was reported to have said that "Pakistan has lost a great religious scholar and leader who served God through the Catholic Church and the people of Pakistan for over half a century with utmost dedication and commitment."

References

20th-century Roman Catholic archbishops in Pakistan
St. Patrick's High School, Karachi alumni
1927 births
2000 deaths
Pakistani school principals and headteachers
Pakistani people of Goan descent
Roman Catholic bishops of Lahore
Roman Catholic archbishops of Lahore